Hemisilurus mekongensis is a species of sheatfish first described by Bornbusch and Lundberg in 1989. Hemisilurus mekongensis is part of the genus Hemisilurus and the family Siluridae.

References 

Siluridae
Fish described in 1989